Irete is a community in Owerri West LGA, Southeastern Nigeria, located near the city of Owerri.

References

Populated places in Imo State
Villages in Igboland